Ectoedemia ilicis is a moth of the family Nepticulidae. It is found in the western Mediterranean Region, in southern France and the Iberian Peninsula.

The wingspan is 5.1-7.2 mm. Adults are on wing from March to the end of June. There is one generation per year.

The larvae feed on Quercus coccifera, Quercus ilex, Quercus ilex rotundifolia and Quercus suber. They mine the leaves of their host plant. The mine consists of a rather long, initially quite narrow, strongly contorted, gallery. The frass is concentrated in a broad central line.

External links
Fauna Europaea
bladmineerders.nl
A Taxonomic Revision Of The Western Palaearctic Species Of The Subgenera Zimmermannia Hering And Ectoedemia Busck s.str. (Lepidoptera, Nepticulidae), With Notes On Their Phylogeny

Nepticulidae
Moths of Europe
Moths described in 1910